The 1912 United States presidential election in Washington took place on November 5, 1912, as part of the 1912 United States presidential election. Voters chose seven representatives, or electors, to the Electoral College, who voted for president and vice president.

Washington was won by the 26th president of the United States Theodore Roosevelt (P–New York), running with governor of California Hiram Johnson, with 35.22% of the popular vote against the Princeton University President Woodrow Wilson (D–New Jersey), running with governor of Indiana Thomas R. Marshall, with 26.90% of the popular vote, the 27th president of the United States William Howard Taft (R–Ohio), running with Columbia University President Nicholas Murray Butler, with 21.82% of the popular vote and the five-time candidate of the Socialist Party of America for President of the United States Eugene V. Debs (S–Indiana), running with the first Socialist mayor of a major city in the United States Emil Seidel, with 12.43% of the popular vote.

As a result of his win as a Progressive, Roosevelt became the first and only third party candidate to win the State of Washington.

Results

Results by county

See also
 United States presidential elections in Washington (state)

References

Washington
1912
1912 Washington (state) elections